Bridgepoint High School is a public continuation high school in Newark, California, United States.

References

High schools in Alameda County, California
Continuation high schools in California